Coronium elegans is a species of sea snail, a marine gastropod mollusc in the family Muricidae, the murex snails or rock snails. It is found off the southeastern coast of Brazil.

References

External links 
 

Molluscs of Brazil
Gastropods described in 1996
Coronium (gastropod)